The 20th Producers Guild of America Awards (also known as 2009 Producers Guild Awards), honoring the best film and television producers of 2008, were held at Hollywood Palladium in Hollywood, California on January 24, 2009. The nominations were announced on December 10, 2008, and January 5, 2009.

Winners and nominees

Film
{| class=wikitable style="width="100%"
|-
! colspan="2" style="background:#abcdef;"| Darryl F. Zanuck Award for Outstanding Producer of Theatrical Motion Pictures
|-
| colspan="2" style="vertical-align:top;"|
 Slumdog Millionaire – Christian Colson The Curious Case of Benjamin Button  – Kathleen Kennedy, Frank Marshall, and Ceán Chaffin
 The Dark Knight – Christopher Nolan, Emma Thomas, and Charles Roven
 Frost/Nixon – Ron Howard, Brian Grazer, and Eric Fellner
 Milk – Bruce Cohen and Dan Jinks
|-
! colspan="2" style="background:#abcdef;"| Outstanding Producer of Animated Theatrical Motion Pictures
|-
| colspan="2" style="vertical-align:top;"|
 WALL-E – Jim Morris Bolt  – Clark Spencer
 Kung Fu Panda – Melissa Cobb
|-
! colspan="2" style="background:#abcdef;"| Outstanding Producer of Documentary Theatrical Motion Pictures
|-
| colspan="2" style="vertical-align:top;"|
 Man on Wire – Simon Chinn Standard Operating Procedure – Julie Ahlberg and Errol Morris
 Trouble the Water – Carl Deal and Tia Lessin
|}

Television

David O. Selznick Achievement Award in Theatrical Motion PicturesMichael DouglasMilestone AwardBrian Grazer and Ron HowardNorman Lear Achievement Award in TelevisionDavid ChaseStanley Kramer Award
Awarded to the motion picture that best illuminates social issues.Milk

Vanguard Award
Awarded in recognition of outstanding achievement in new media and technology.
Chris DeWolfe and Tom Anderson

Visionary Award
Honored to a producer exemplifying unique or uplifting quality.
Jeff Skoll

References

2008 film awards
2008 television awards
2008 guild awards
 2008